This is a list of countries by industrial production growth rate mostly based on The World Factbook,  accessed in January 2021.

Notes

Lists of countries by production
Production economics